The New Hampshire Wing of the Civil Air Patrol (NHWG) is the highest echelon of the Civil Air Patrol (CAP) in New Hampshire, in the United States. Its headquarters is located in Concord, New Hampshire, near the Concord Municipal Airport. The New Hampshire Wing is part of the Northeast Region of CAP.

It currently has 8 squadrons and 1 flight: the Concord Composite Squadron (Concord), the Greater Nashua Composite Squadron (Nashua), the Hawk Composite Squadron (Laconia), the Monadnock Composite Squadron (Keene), the Seacoast Composite Squadron (Portsmouth), the Lebanon Composite Squadron (Lebanon), the Highlanders Cadet Squadron (Rochester), the Manchester Composite Squadron (Manchester), and the Mount Washington Flight (Whitefield).

Mission
The Civil Air Patrol has three missions: providing emergency services; offering cadet programs for youth; and providing aerospace education for CAP members and the general public.

Members of the New Hampshire Wing have flown missions searching aerially for forest fires. The New Hampshire Wing, alongside Civil Air Patrol wings from other states, provided aerial photography of the damage caused by Hurricane Sandy along the east coast of the United States at the request of FEMA.

Membership

Youth aged 12-18 may join the Civil Air Patrol as cadets in a cadet squadron, and may continue to serve as a cadet until the age of 21. Adult members aged 18 and older may join a senior squadron, or be assigned to a cadet squadron in a management capacity. Composite squadrons may contain both cadet and senior programs.

Organization

Resources
As of December 2020, New Hampshire Wing has 7 single-engine planes (2 Cessna 172 Skyhawks, 4 Cessna 182 Skylanes and a Cessna R182 Skylane RG). The wing also has 15 vehicles, principally 10-15 passenger vans at each of the squadrons. There are also 7 fixed radio repeaters around the state, 2 airborne-capable portable repeaters, about 75 fixed and mobile VHF stations, and 15 HF radio stations.

Congressional Gold Medal

In January 2015, thirteen original members of the New Hampshire Wing of the Civil Air Patrol were presented the Congressional Gold Medal in a ceremony at the Aviation Museum of New Hampshire. This medal and the Presidential Medal of Freedom are the highest civilian awards in the United States. It is awarded to persons "who have performed an achievement that has an impact on American history and culture that is likely to be recognized as a major achievement in the recipient's field long after the achievement."

On December 10, 2018, Air Force Secretary Heather Wilson was presented with the Civil Air Patrol Congressional Gold Medal in honor of her late grandfather, former New Hampshire Wing Commander Colonel George "Scotty" Wilson. Colonel Wilson served as a CAP pilot during World War II and later as the third New Hampshire Wing Commander, from November 1948 until September 1954.

The medal is on permanent display at the Smithsonian Institution, while three-inch bronze replicas have been presented to individuals and family members in New Hampshire and elsewhere.

See also
Awards and decorations of the Civil Air Patrol
New Hampshire Air National Guard
New Hampshire State Guard

References

External links 
 

Wings of the Civil Air Patrol
Education in New Hampshire
Military in New Hampshire